Lee Mu-jin (born December 28, 2000) is a South Korean singer-songwriter. He rose to fame after appearing on the music audition show Sing Again in 2020, in which he finished in 3rd place. His 2021 single, "Traffic Light", spent three weeks at number one on South Korea's Gaon Digital Chart. Since 2022, he is the main host on KBS music web show, LeeMujin Service.

Personal life 
Lee was born in Goyang, Gyeonggi Province, South Korea. He is a student at Seoul Institute of the Arts.

Discography

Extended plays

Singles

Soundtrack appearances

Compilation appearances

Filmography

Television shows

Web shows

Concert 
 Bonus Book Appendix (2022–2023)

Awards and nominations

Listicles

Notes

References

External links 

 

Living people
2000 births
South Korean male singers
South Korean pop singers
South Korean folk singers
People from Goyang
BPM Entertainment artists